Carlota Pereda (born 1975) is a Spanish film and television director and screenwriter.

Biography 
Carlota Pereda was born in Madrid in 1975. She studied at the ECAM. She began her career in television, developing scripts for Periodistas. She went on to collaborate in different capacities (including screenwriting and director) in other television shows such as Mis adorables vecinos, Los hombres de Paco, Águila Roja, Luna, el misterio de Calenda, B&b, de boca en boca, El secreto de Puente Viejo, and Acacias 38.

Her first short film was Las rubias ('The Blondes'). Her sophomore short film, Cerdita, won the Forqué Award and the Goya Award for Best Short Film. Another short film, There Will Be Monsters, followed. She adapted Cerdita to a full-length format in her debut feature, Piggy (2022), which won the Méliès d'Or. In October 2022, she began shooting of her second feature, La ermita ('The Hermitage').

References 

21st-century Spanish screenwriters
Spanish women screenwriters
Spanish film directors
Spanish women film directors
Spanish television directors
1975 births
Living people